The Beaufort Hotel in Chepstow, Wales is located at the southeast corner of Beaufort Square in the town centre. It was designated a Grade II listed building in 1975. It was established in the 16th century as a coaching inn; it claims to be the oldest continuously trading hotel in south Wales. Historically the hotel has served as an auction house.

References

External links
Official site

Chepstow
Coaching inns
Grade II listed buildings in Monmouthshire
Grade II listed hotels
Hotels in Monmouthshire
Pubs in Wales